is a town located in Ochi District, Ehime Prefecture, Japan. , the town had an estimated population of 6,332 in 3780 households and a population density of 210 persons per km2.

Geography 
Kamijima is an archipelago of 25 islands (seven of which are inhabited) the Seto Inland Sea in between Shikoku and Honshu, and is considered a subgroup of the Geiyo Islands. The highest elevation is Mount Sekizen on Iwaki Island, with a height of 370 meters. The main islands are Yugeshima, Sashima, Iwagishima, Akonejima, Tsunamijima, Ikinajima, Uoshima, Takaikamishima, Teshima, Enoshima, Hyakunoshima, Hyakkanjima (the northernmost tip of Ehime Prefecture)

Climate
Kamijima has a Humid subtropical climate (Köppen Cfa) characterized by warm summers and cool winters with light snowfall.  The average annual temperature in Kamijima is 15.8 °C. The average annual rainfall is 1418 mm with September as the wettest month. The temperatures are highest on average in January, at around 27.2 °C, and lowest in January, at around 5.2 °C.

Demographics
Per Japanese census data, the population of Kamijima has been generally decreasing since the 1960s and is now less than it was a century ago.

History 
The area of Kamijima was part of ancient Iyo province, and during the Edo Period was part of the holdings of Iyo-Matsuyama Domain. The islands were strategically important for controlling trade in the Seto Inland Sea and became part of the route for daimyō from far western Japan to travel to-and-from the Shogun's court in Edo as part of their sankin kōtai obligation. The village of Yuge was established on December 15, 1889, with the creation of the modern municipalities system. It was elevated to town status on January 1, 1953. On October 1, 2004, Yuge merged of the villages of Ikina, Iwagi, and Uoshima, to form the town of Kamijima.

Government
Kamijima has a mayor-council form of government with a directly elected mayor and a unicameral town council of 13 members.  Kamijima, together with Imabari, contributes six members to the Ehime Prefectural Assembly. In terms of national politics, the town is part of Ehime 2nd district of the lower house of the Diet of Japan.

Economy
The economy of Kamijima is centered on aquaculture, horticulture and nursing care. The area around the islands is noted as a fishing ground for sea bream. Nori seaweed farming has long been popular. Shipbuilding-related industries are located on Iwagishima, including a machinery factory owned by Imabari Shipbuilding.

Education
Kamijima has four public elementary schools and three public middle school operated by the town government, and one public high school operated by the Ehime Prefectural Board of Education.

Transportation 
Transportation is entirely depends on sea transportation. Distance between the larger inhabited  islands is short, and there are ferries that operate shuttles, albeit small ones, during the daytime hours. However,  the car ferry is only connected to the Hiroshima Prefecture side, and there is no means of direct access by car to Ehime Prefecture.

Points of interest 
 Kubota Palm Garden
 Yugeshima Shōen ruins, National Historic Site

Noted people from Kamijima
Kamijima is the hometown of the British musician David Sinclair.

References

External links

Kamijima official website 

Towns in Ehime Prefecture
Kamijima, Ehime